The Richmond Fire Station, or Former Richmond Fire Station, at 131 Lord Street in Richmond, Victoria, a suburb of Melbourne, Australia is a historic fire station which was built in 1893.

It is a two-storey late Victorian red brick building.  When it was built, the building was considered important "because it incorporated a fire services system similar to those which were used in America";  it was reported that it has "'a very imposing appearance, and is replete with the latest fire-fighting appliances. Electricity plays a leading part in the new service. By simply connecting the current by the merest pressure of a button, or pulling a cord, open fly the main doors, the horse rushes out of the stable, and backing itself into the horse-cart, is harnessed in full going order within 20 seconds. With such a marvellously perfect system, ought we not to henceforth feel secure against the devastating elements of fire.'"

"Architecturally, the building is a particularly simple and bold late Victorian composition. The building is an unusual and prominent heritage element on a corner in an otherwise predominantly residential area. The building was designed by prominent Melbourne architect and former Richmond councillor and mayor, J.A.B. Koch."

See also
Richmond Metropolitan Fire Station

References

Fire stations in Victoria (Australia)
Heritage-listed buildings in Melbourne
Fire stations completed in 1893
Buildings and structures in the City of Yarra
1893 establishments in Australia